For information on all Davidson College sports, see Davidson Wildcats

The Davidson Wildcats baseball team is a varsity intercollegiate athletic team of Davidson College in Davidson, North Carolina, United States. The team is a member of the Atlantic 10 Conference, which is part of the National Collegiate Athletic Association's Division I. Davidson's first baseball team was fielded in 1902. The team plays its home games at T. Henry Wilson, Jr. Field in Davidson, North Carolina. The Wildcats are coached by Rucker Taylor.

See also
List of NCAA Division I baseball programs

References

External links
 

 
Baseball teams established in 1902